The Mall at Sierra Vista is an indoor shopping center in Sierra Vista, Arizona, United States owned and managed by Kohan Retail Investment Group. It was constructed during the late 1990s. Sierra Vista was one of the fastest-growing communities in Arizona and the major population center for southeastern Arizona. The developers had hoped to market to the growing community, which had no other malls.

This regional mall serves a large portion of southeastern Arizona and northern parts of the Mexican state of Sonora.

In addition to shopping, the Mall at Sierra Vista hosts the annual Festival of Trees, the Festival of Giving,<ref name="Ory2">Ory, Laura (2007-10-28). "Habitat for Humanity group gets a new home" The Sierra Vista Herald. Last accessed 2007-11-26.</ref> and an annual Car Show for the Boys and Girls Club. The Mall merits a mention in Ethel Jackson Price's 2003 book, Sierra Vista: a Young City with a Past''.

In 2015, Sears Holdings spun off 235 of its properties, including the Sears at The Mall as Sierra Vista, into Seritage Growth Properties. On October 15, 2018, it was announced that Sears would be closing as part of a plan to close 142 stores nationwide. In January 2019, Seritage listed the Sears property for sale due to limited redevelopment opportunities.

In May 2019, the mall was listed for sale; For 2 years, no buyer has been found. Then in July 2021, Kohan Retail Investment Group purchased the mall alongside 6 other malls from Brookfield Asset Management.

Anchors
 Cinemark 10 (34,778 sq ft.)
 Dillard's (101,123 sq ft.)
 Best Buy (20,512 sq ft.)

References

External links
 Official site

Shopping malls in Arizona
Buildings and structures in Cochise County, Arizona
Tourist attractions in Cochise County, Arizona
Shopping malls established in 1999
Sierra Vista, Arizona
1999 establishments in Arizona
Kohan Retail Investment Group